Thomas Cusack (born 1 March 1993) is an Australian professional rugby union player who plays as a flanker for the , as well as serving as vice-captain in Super Rugby. Additionally, he previously represented Australia in rugby sevens.

Early life
Thomas Anthony Cusack was born in Canberra, ACT to an Australian father and Italian mother, and holds a dual Australian-Italian citizenship. He attended Marist College Canberra for his high school years, graduating in 2011. A former member of the ARU National Gold Squad, the ARU’s national Rugby development program for high school students, he showed a talent for rugby at an early age. Cusack was selected for Australia Schoolboys rugby team in 2010. He subsequently began studies toward a Sports Coaching and Exercise Science degree at University of Canberra before switching to a Bachelor of Business Management which he completed in 2018.

Rugby career
Cusack joined the Canberra Royals for his rugby at club level. He was a member of the ARU's National Academy and played for Australia Under-20 at the 2012 Junior World Championships.

Australian Sevens
In February 2013, Cusack was brought into the Australian Sevens squad. He made his debut for Australia at the Wellington Sevens tournament and quickly established himself as an asset with ball in hand. Cusack represented Australia in the 2013 Rugby Sevens World Cup, scoring two tries, and was a squad member at the 2014 Commonwealth Games in Scotland. By December 2015, he had thirteen national caps in rugby sevens. He had a wrist ligament reconstruction surgery in early 2016, but recovered in time to compete for Australia at the 2016 Summer Olympics.

NRC
Cusack played for the Canberra Vikings in the inaugural National Rugby Championship (NRC) in 2014, scoring a try against the Rams in his only appearance for the season. In 2016 he turned out for NSW Country, playing in seven matches for the minor premiership-winning team, including the grand final loss to Perth in Tamworth. In 2017 Cusack was named Canberra Vikings Captain, and was awarded NRC’s players player, voted by not only his team mates but his NRC opponents.

Super Rugby
Cusack made his Super Rugby debut for the Brumbies against the Melbourne Rebels in April 2017. In 2019, he signed on until the end of the 2021 season in a dual contract with the Australian Sevens. In the 2020 Super Rugby season, he was named vice-captain, supporting Allan Alaalatoa as Captain.

References

External links

 Statistics on It's Rugby
 Brumbies profile 
 
 

1993 births
Australian rugby union players
Commonwealth Games rugby sevens players of Australia
Male rugby sevens players
Australia international rugby sevens players
Living people
Rugby sevens players at the 2016 Summer Olympics
Olympic rugby sevens players of Australia
Commonwealth Games medallists in rugby sevens
Commonwealth Games bronze medallists for Australia
Rugby sevens players at the 2014 Commonwealth Games
Rugby union flankers
Canberra Vikings players
New South Wales Country Eagles players
ACT Brumbies players
Medallists at the 2014 Commonwealth Games